Lyndhurst is a small city in Cuyahoga County, Ohio, United States, and an eastern suburb of Cleveland. The population was 14,050 at the 2020 census. A small part of Lyndhurst was originally part of Mayfield Township.

History
The land currently comprising Lyndhurst was part of the Connecticut Western Reserve, obtained via treaty with the Iroquois tribe in 1796 by the Connecticut Land Company. In 1797, Moses Cleaveland named the area east of the Cuyahoga River "Euclid," after the Greek Mathematician and Patron Saint of surveyors. Euclid Township was officially formed in 1809. Despite this, Lyndhurst's population consisted mostly of Native American Indians until after the War of 1812.

In 1828 Euclid Township was divided into nine districts, with the present area of Lyndhurst becoming district four.

From 1877 the main traffic corridor has been Mayfield Road (U.S. Route 322). Initially a wood-planked toll road, it is now home to many retail establishments and restaurants.

The earliest industry was farming. As the area grew, it became known as Euclidville Village, the name changing to Lyndhurst Village in 1920 before Lyndhurst was formally incorporated as a city in 1921.

Population growth in Lyndhurst, which tapered during the Great Depression, skyrocketed during the postwar period, driven by both the baby boom and white flight from the urban center of Cleveland. Lyndhurst's population peaked in the 1970s. By 1980, lacking large tracts of available land for development, and with a population shift to exurban communities, the population of Lyndhurst began to shrink. The 2010, population of Lyndhurst was 29% less than its peak during the 1970s.

Geography

Demographics

The median income for a household in the city was $52,272, and the median income for a family was $64,961. Males had a median income of $45,172 versus $31,652 for females. The per capita income for the city was $28,206. About 1.3% of families and 2.5% of the population were below the poverty line, including 1.4% of those under age 18 and 3.3% of those age 65 or over.

Of the city's population over the age of 25, 43.2% held a bachelor's degree or higher.

2010 census
As of the census of 2010, there were 14,001 people, 6,447 households, and 3,826 families residing in the city. The racial makeup of the city was 90.3% White, 6.4% African American, 1.6% Asian, 0.4% from other races, and 1.2% from two or more races. Hispanic or Latino of any race were 1.3% of the population.

There were 6,447 households, of which 21.4% had children under the age of 18 living with them, 48.2% were married couples living together, 8.4% had a female householder with no husband present, 2.8% had a male householder with no wife present, and 40.7% were non-families. 35.5% of all households were made up of individuals, and 17.3% had someone living alone who was 65 years of age or older. The average household size was 2.15 and the average family size was 2.80.

The median age in the city was 47 years. 17.4% of residents were under the age of 18; 5.2% were between the ages of 18 and 24; 25% were from 25 to 44; 28.1% were from 45 to 64; and 24.3% were 65 years of age or older. The gender makeup of the city was 46.0% male and 54.0% female.

Arts and culture
Eggshelland is an annual lawn display of Easter egg mosaics, originally located at a resident's home between 1957 and 2013, during which time it became the subject of a documentary film. A different party took ownership of the maintenance of Eggshelland in 2014, since then locating the display in various locations in and around Lyndhurst.

Education
Schools of the South Euclid-Lyndhurst City School District in Lyndhurst are Sunview Elementary School and Charles F. Brush High School.

Notable people
 Eric Carmen, musician and lead singer of the Raspberries
 Nick Caserio, NFL executive and general manager of the Houston Texans
 Steven Hirsch, founder of Vivid Entertainment
 Josh Mandel, former Ohio State Treasurer
 The Poni-Tails, 1950s girl group
 Rick Smith Jr, professional illusionist and card thrower.
 Mike Trivisonno, radio broadcaster for WTAM

References

External links

 City of Lyndhurst official website

Cities in Ohio
Cities in Cuyahoga County, Ohio
Cleveland metropolitan area